In differential geometry the Hitchin–Thorpe inequality is a relation which restricts the topology of 4-manifolds that carry an Einstein metric.

Statement of the Hitchin–Thorpe inequality 
Let M be a closed, oriented, four-dimensional smooth manifold.  If there exists a Riemannian metric on M which is an Einstein metric, then
 

This inequality was first stated by John Thorpe in a footnote to a 1969 paper focusing on manifolds of higher dimension.

Already in 1961, Marcel Berger showed that the Euler characteristic is always non-negative.

Proof 
Let  be a four-dimensional smooth Riemannian manifold which is Einstein.

relative to the basis .

According to Chern-Weil theory, if  is oriented then the Euler characteristic and signature of  can be computed by

Equipped with these tools, the Hitchin-Thorpe inequality amounts to the elementary observation

Failure of the converse 
A natural question to ask is whether the Hitchin–Thorpe inequality provides a sufficient condition for the existence of Einstein metrics.  In 1995, Claude LeBrun and 
Andrea Sambusetti  independently showed that the answer is no:  there exist infinitely many non-homeomorphic compact, smooth, oriented 4-manifolds  that carry no Einstein metrics but nevertheless satisfy

 

LeBrun's examples are actually simply connected, and the relevant obstruction depends on the smooth structure of the manifold. By contrast,  Sambusetti's obstruction  only applies to 4-manifolds with infinite fundamental group, but the volume-entropy estimate he uses to prove non-existence  only depends on the homotopy type of the manifold.

Footnotes

References 

Einstein manifolds
Geometric inequalities
Einstein manifold